Vysoky is a stratovolcano located in the southeastern part of Kamchatka Peninsula, Russia.
Its name literally means "tall" or "high" in Russian.

See also
 List of volcanoes in Russia

References 
 

Mountains of the Kamchatka Peninsula
Volcanoes of the Kamchatka Peninsula
Stratovolcanoes of Russia
Holocene stratovolcanoes